The 2005 Kazakhstan Premier League was the 14th season of the Kazakhstan Premier League, the highest football league competition in Kazakhstan, and took place between 2 April and 6 November.

Teams
For the 2005 season, the league was reduced to 16, so with Semey, Kaisar, Akzhayik and Yassi-Sairam being relegated the previous season, only Bulat-MST were promoted.

Before the start of the season Aktobe-Lento became Aktobe and newly promoted Bolat CSKA became Bulat-MSK.

Team overview

League table

Results

Season statistics

Top scorers

References

Kazakhstan Premier League seasons
1
Kazakh
Kazakh